Su He (born 4 July 1957) is a Chinese speed skater. He competed in the men's 500 metres event at the 1980 Winter Olympics.

References

External links
 

1957 births
Living people
Chinese male speed skaters
Olympic speed skaters of China
Speed skaters at the 1980 Winter Olympics
Place of birth missing (living people)